The 1999 European Fencing Championships were held in Bolzano, Italy. The event took place from 22 to 27 June 1999 at the PalaOnda. 250 fencers participated in eleven events, amongst which women's individual sabre was for the first time featured.

Medal summary

Men's events

Women's events

Medal table

References 
 Results at the European Fencing Confederation

1999
European Fencing Championships
European Fencing Championships
Bolzano
International fencing competitions hosted by Italy